Karg is a surname. People with this surname or its variants include:

 Christiane Karg (born 1980), German operatic soprano
 Diego Karg (born 1990), Dutch professional footballer
 Gabriel Karg (c. 1570–between 1630 and 1640), Swabian artist 
 Morné Karg (born 1977), Namibian cricketer
 Sigfrid Karg-Elert (1877–1933), German composer
 Stefanie Karg Waibl (born 1986), German volleyball player

Surnames
Surnames from nicknames